Project is the second collaborative studio album by guitarists Greg Howe and Richie Kotzen, released on November 11, 1997 through Shrapnel Records. A previous collaboration between Howe and Kotzen, Tilt (1995), had sold well and thus resulted in a second album.

Track listing

Personnel
Greg Howe – guitar (left stereo channel), drum programming (tracks 1, 3, 5, 7, 9), bass (tracks 1, 3, 9), engineering (tracks 1, 3, 5, 7, 9), mixing (tracks 1, 3, 5, 7, 9), production (except tracks 2, 4, 6, 8, 10)
Richie Kotzen – guitar (right stereo channel), keyboard, bass (tracks 2, 4, 6, 8, 10)
Atma Anur – drums (tracks 2, 4, 6, 8, 10)
Kevin Vecchione – bass (tracks 5, 7)
Dexter Smittle – mixing (tracks 2, 4, 6, 8, 10), production (tracks 2, 4, 6, 8, 10)
Lole Diro – mixing (tracks 2, 4, 6, 8, 10), production (tracks 2, 4, 6, 8, 10)

References

External links
In Review: Kotzen/Howe "Project" at Guitar Nine Records

Greg Howe albums
Richie Kotzen albums
1997 albums
Shrapnel Records albums
Collaborative albums
Albums recorded in a home studio